Sunshine Superman is the third studio album by British singer-songwriter Donovan. It was released in the United States on August 26, 1966, but was not released in the UK because of a contractual dispute. In June 1967, a compilation of tracks from this album and the follow-up Mellow Yellow was released as Sunshine Superman in the UK. Both versions were named after Donovan's hit single released in the US in July 1966. The album was Donovan's most successful, peaking at number 11 in the US and remaining on the Billboard Top LPs chart for six months. The UK edition peaked at number 25. The tracks from Sunshine Superman and Mellow Yellow were not mixed into stereo, with the exception of "Season of the Witch", until the 2011 2-CD deluxe edition issued by UK EMI.

History

Whilst still incorporating folk music, these recordings mark a distinct change in Donovan's music, representing some of the first psychedelia released. A full rock band backs up Donovan on many of the songs, and the instrumentation had been expanded, being one of the first pop albums extensively to use the sitar and other unique musical instruments. This change is partially the result of working with producer Mickie Most, whose pop sensibilities led to chart hits for many other artists at the time.

Sunshine Superman involves psychedelic rock, psychedelic folk, psychedelic pop  and folk rock  styles. The album's lyrical content encompasses Donovan's increasing ability to portray "Swinging London" and give listeners an insider's look into the mid-sixties pop scene. He was close to the Beatles and Brian Jones at this time, and he became widely known after "Sunshine Superman" became a chart-topper in the US, and hit number 2 in the UK. Donovan's penchant for name-dropping in songs such as two influenced by his travel to Los Angeles, "The Trip" and "The Fat Angel" (written for Cass Elliot) coupled with his chart success helped elevate him to superstar status. In addition to noting the people in the pop scene, Donovan recorded "Bert's Blues" for his friend and folk music notable Bert Jansch. Contrasting this modern bent was Donovan's fascination with medieval themes in such songs. The title track was also inspired by Brian Jones' girlfriend Linda Lawrence.

Several other songs were recorded for Sunshine Superman, but did not make the cut. These include "Museum" (later rerecorded and released on Mellow Yellow), "Superlungs My Supergirl" (later rerecorded and released on Barabajagal) and "Breezes of Patchulie" (originally called "Darkness of My Night" and released on Donovan's 1964 demo collection Sixty Four). The Sunshine Superman recordings of these songs were all included on Troubadour The Definitive Collection 1964–1976.

Legacy

In 2017, Sunshine Superman was ranked the 199th greatest album of the 1960s by Pitchfork.

In the video for the Beatles' "A Day in the Life", a close up of a spinning turntable shows the Epic Records version of Sunshine Superman playing. The film was shot at the recording sessions for the song, which was included on Sgt. Pepper's Lonely Hearts Club Band. A cover version of "The Fat Angel" was recorded by Jefferson Airplane for their 1968 live album Bless Its Pointed Little Head. Monster Magnet covered "Three King Fishers" (as "Three Kingfishers") on their 2013 album Last Patrol, with a live version included on 2014's Milking the Stars: A Re-Imagining of Last Patrol.

Track listing

Original US release
All tracks are written by Donovan.

Side one
"Sunshine Superman"3:15
"Legend of a Girl Child Linda"6:50
"Three King Fishers"3:16
"Ferris Wheel"4:12
"Bert's Blues"3:56

Side two
"Season of the Witch"4:56
"The Trip"4:34
"Guinevere"3:41
"The Fat Angel"4:11
"Celeste"4:08

UK release
Due to the contractual dispute between Pye Records and Epic Records, Donovan's releases were held back in the UK throughout 1966 and early 1967. During this time, Donovan released Sunshine Superman and Mellow Yellow in the US. To catch up to the Epic Records schedule in America, Pye Records compiled a cross-section of both albums and titled it Sunshine Superman.

It was released in the UK (Pye NPL 18181) in June 1967 and reached #25 in the British charts.

Side one
"Sunshine Superman"
"Legend of a Girl Child Linda"
"The Observation"
"Guinevere"
"Celeste"
"Writer in the Sun"

Side two
"Season of the Witch"
"Hampstead Incident"
"Sand and Foam"
"Young Girl Blues"
"Three Kingfishers"
"Bert's Blues"

(Titles in italics are from Mellow Yellow)

Personnel
 Donovan – vocals, guitar, organ
 Bobby Ray – bass guitar
 Eddie Hoh – drums
 Shawn Phillips – sitar

On "Sunshine Superman" and other tracks recorded in England:
 Donovan – vocals, acoustic guitar
 Jimmy Page, Eric Ford – electric guitar
 John Cameron – keyboards, arrangement
 Spike Heatley – bass guitar
 Bobby Orr – drums
 Tony Carr – percussion

References

External links

 Sunshine Superman (Adobe Flash) at Radio3Net (streamed copy where licensed)
 

1966 albums
Donovan albums
Albums produced by Mickie Most
Epic Records albums